Bright Adjei (born 27 April 1994) is a Ghanaian professional footballer who plays as a forward for Tanzanian Premier League side Singida Big Stars. He won the Ghana Premier League in his second season with Aduana Stars. He previously played for Tema Youth and Kuwiati side Burgan SC.

Club career

Elmina Sharks 
Adjei started his career with Elmina Sharks in 2010. He played as an amateur player until 2012 where he scored nine(9) goals for the club.

Tema Youth 
He secured a move to Tema Youth in 2012 at the age of 18years old. He scored 22 goals in the space of 3years for the club where he secured a promotion from the 3rd tier to the 2nd tier for the club, acquiring the top scorers award in 2015 before securing a move to Aduana Stars in 2015. He was very instrumental in Tema Youth's second-place finish in the second-tier league, Ghana Division One League in 2015. In October 2015, he was linked with a move to Ghana Premier League side Aduana Stars.

Aduana Stars 
In December 2015, Aduana Stars announced that they had secured the services of Adjei and Zakaria Mumuni on a 3-year contract ahead of the 2016 Ghana Premier League campaign. In his debut season, he immediately established himself as a key player for the club playing 15 out of 30 matches and scoring a whopping 12 goals to help Aduana Stars to a second position with 49 points only missing out on the ultimate by 2 points to eventual winners Wa All Stars. In March 2016, his 85th minute acrobatic goal against Ashanti Gold in game week 4 of the league at Len Clay Stadium in Obuasi, was nominated for the CNN Goal of the Week award. He beat off competition from Barcelona's Luis Suarez, Celtic's Tom Rogic, and Pumas' Javier Cortés to poll 81 per cent of the total votes cast to win the award.

In August 2016, Adjei scored another overhead kick goal in Aduana's 1–1 draw at WAFA in Sogakope during the match day 27 Ghana Premier League match, which earned him another nomination for the CNN Goal of the Week award. He won for the second time beating the likes of Bayern Munich's Xabi Alonso, Anderlecht's Łukasz Teodorczyk and Elliot Durrell of Chester. He became the first ever two-time winner of the award.

The following season, 2017 season, he continued his impressive form by playing 17 league matches and scoring 7 goals to help Aduana secure the club's second league title in their history. During that period he formed a good attacking partnership with Yahaya Mohammed. In April 2017, it was reported that he had flown in to Sudan to sign a two-year contract with Sudanese giants, Al Hilal, the deal however fell through and he returned to Aduana Stars.

Burgan SC 
In August 2019, Adjei joined Kuwaiti side Burgan SC on a free transfer after his contract with Aduana Stars ended. He signed a one-year deal with an option to extend the contract at the end.
Bright scored 10 goals having played 40matches for the Kuwaiti side.

Return to Aduana Stars 
After running into his contract with Kuwaiti side, Adjei returned to Ghana and joined his previous club Aduana Stars. There were rumours that he was in advantaged stage of signing for Accra Hearts of Oak. On 22 December 2020, he scored the equalizer to help Aduana salvage a draw in a 1–1 Bono derby match against rivals Berekum Chelsea.

Since his return to Aduana Football Club, Bright has went on to play 58 Matches scoring 24 goals making him the all time top scorer of Aduana FC with 42 goals, surpassing Yahaya Mohammed, who has 41. His last game on 25th September 2022 when he faced FC Samartex 1996 which ended 2-2 stalemate.

Bright now has 83goals in Career in 130+ games.

International career 
Adjei was a member of the Ghana national under-23 football team, the Black Meteors in 2015. He was a member of the squad that featured during the 2015 All-African Games in Brazzaville, Republic of the Congo. He also earned call-ups to the local Black Stars in the past.

Honours 
Aduana Stars

 All Time TopScorer (42)
 Ghana Premier League: 2017
 Ghana Super Cup: 2018
Individual
 CNN Goal of the Week Award (2): (March 2016, August 2016)

 Ghana Premier League Player of the month: February 2022
19 Sep 2022 - All Time Aduana FC Top Scorer (42)

References

External links 

 
 
 

Living people
1994 births
Association football forwards
Ghanaian footballers
Burgan SC players
Aduana Stars F.C. players
Tema Youth players
Ghana Premier League players
Ghanaian expatriate sportspeople in Kuwait
Expatriate footballers in Kuwait